Stephen James Susdorf (born March 28, 1986), is an American former professional baseball outfielder, who played in Major League Baseball (MLB) for the Philadelphia Phillies briefly, in . He batted and threw left-handed.

Career

Minor League career
Susdorf was drafted in the 27th round of the 2007 MLB draft by the Detroit Tigers, but he did not sign, instead returning to Fresno State for his senior season. The 2008 Fresno State Bulldogs won the College World Series, and Susdorf was drafted in the 19th round of the 2008 MLB draft by the Philadelphia Phillies. Susdorf was assigned to Short Season Williamsport, but also played 2 games for Single-A Lakewood. In 50 total games, he hit .295 with 5 HR and 35 RBI.

Susdorf began 2009 with Lakewood, but after about a month, he was promoted to A-Advanced Clearwater. After a month and a half with Clearwater, he was promoted to the Double-A Reading Phillies. In 85 total games, he hit .324 with 7 HR and 44 RBI. After the season, Susdorf played with the Scottsdale Scorpions of the Arizona Fall League.

Susdorf spent 2010 with Clearwater, where in 128 games, he hit .278 with 11 HR and 77 RBI. Susdorf began the 2011 season with Reading, but his season came to a close at the end of July, after he dislocated his left shoulder and later required surgery to repair his right knee while trying to beat a grounder. Susdorf began the 2012 season with Reading, but was promoted to Triple-A Lehigh Valley in mid-May. In 117 total games, he hit .286 with 2 HR and 41 RBI.

Susdorf began the 2013 season with Lehigh Valley, but after 70 games, he was promoted to Philadelphia. At the time, he was hitting .335 with 1 HR and 25 RBI and 8 SB.

Major League career

Philadelphia Phillies
On July 25, 2013, Susdorf was called up by the Phillies to replace Domonic Brown, who was placed on the 7-day disabled list with a concussion. He made his major league debut that day as a pinch-hitter, grounding into a double play. His first hit, a double off of Rick Porcello of the Detroit Tigers, came in his first start. On July 30, Susdorf was designated for assignment to make room for Cody Asche. On July 10, 2014 the Phillies released him from their AAA affiliate.

References

External links

Steve Susdorf at Pura Pelota (Venezuelan Professional Baseball League)
Steve Susdorf Fresno State Bulldogs biography

1986 births
Living people
Baseball players from California
Clearwater Threshers players
Fresno State Bulldogs baseball players
Lakewood BlueClaws players
Lehigh Valley IronPigs players
Leones del Caracas players
American expatriate baseball players in Venezuela
Major League Baseball first basemen
Major League Baseball outfielders
Sportspeople from Santa Clarita, California
People from Valencia, Santa Clarita, California
Philadelphia Phillies players
Reading Phillies players
Scottsdale Scorpions players
Williamsport Crosscutters players